Dianthus haematocalyx  is a herbaceous perennial plant belonging to the family Caryophyllaceae natively occurring in Albania and Greece.

References

haematocalyx
Flora of Greece
Flora of Albania